Jean-Baptiste Peyras-Loustalet (born 5 January 1984) is a French rugby union player. Peyras-Loustalet, who is a winger, plays his club rugby for Montpellier after signing from Bayonne. He made his debut for France against Australia on 5 July 2008.

In 2003 Peyras-Loustalet was named as the IRB International U19 Player of the Year.

References

External links
FFR profile 

1984 births
Living people
Sportspeople from Pau, Pyrénées-Atlantiques
French rugby union players
France international rugby union players
Rugby union wings
Aviron Bayonnais players
Section Paloise players
AS Béziers Hérault players
Castres Olympique players
Union Bordeaux Bègles players
Montpellier Hérault Rugby players